Brock Matthew Porter (born June 3, 2003) is an American professional baseball pitcher in the Texas Rangers organization.

Amateur career
Porter attended St. Mary's Preparatory in Orchard Lake Village, Michigan. As a freshman in 2019, he pitched to a 9-2 record with a 1.20 ERA and 85 strikeouts, leading St. Mary's to a state championship. He committed to play college baseball at Clemson University after his freshman year, choosing the Tigers over offers from Duke University, the University of Miami, and the University of Tennessee. As a junior in 2021, he went 12-0 with a 0.56 ERA and 126 strikeouts over  innings, leading St. Mary's to a 43-1 record and another state title. He was named the Gatorade Player of the Year for the state of Michigan.

Porter entered his senior season in 2022 as a top prospect for the upcoming draft. During the season, he threw a no-hitter in which he struck out 11 batters on 47 pitches. He was named the Gatorade Michigan Player of the Year for the second straight season. Porter was also named the Gatorade Baseball Player of the Year. He finished his senior year with a 9-0 record, a 0.29 ERA, 109 strikeouts and 23 walks, helping St. Mary's to a perfect 44-0 record.

Professional career
Expected to be a first round selection in the 2022 Major League Baseball draft, Porter was not selected until the fourth round with the 109th overall selection by the Texas Rangers. On July 27, 2022, Porter signed with Texas for a $3.7 million signing bonus, the largest ever given to a pick after the second round.

References

External links

2003 births
Living people
Baseball players from Michigan
Baseball pitchers
Sportspeople from Metro Detroit
St. Mary's Preparatory alumni